The Bluenose Squash Classic 2012 is the 2012's Bluenose Classic, which is a tournament of the PSA World Tour event International (Prize money : 55 000 $). The event took place in Halifax in Canada from 28 March to 1 April. Thierry Lincou won his second Bluenose Squash Classic trophy, beating Daryl Selby in the final.

Prize money and ranking points
For 2012, the prize purse was $55,000. The prize money and points breakdown is as follows:

Seeds

Draw and results

See also
PSA World Tour 2012
Bluenose Classic

References

External links
PSA Bluenose Squash Classic 2012 website
Bluenose Squash Classic 2012 official website

Squash tournaments in Canada
Bluenose Squash Classic
Bluenose Squash Classic
Bluenose Squash Classic
Bluenose Squash Classic